Božo Jemc (born 10 March 1940) is a Slovenian ski jumper. He competed in the normal hill and large hill events at the 1964 Winter Olympics.

References

1940 births
Living people
Slovenian male ski jumpers
Olympic ski jumpers of Yugoslavia
Ski jumpers at the 1964 Winter Olympics
People from Bled